The 1934–35 Hong Kong First Division League season was the 27th since its establishment.

League table

References
1934–35 Hong Kong First Division table (RSSSF)
香港倒後鏡blog

Hong Kong First Division League seasons
Hong
3